Chacsinkín Municipality (Yucatec Maya: "firewood reddened by time or plant of the red flowers") is one of the 106 municipalities in the Mexican state of Yucatán containing (158.40 km2) of land and is located roughly  southeast of the city of Mérida.

History
There is no accurate data on when the town was founded, but it was a settlement before the conquest and a part of the chieftainship of Tutul Xiú. After colonization, the area became part of the encomienda system with Lorenzo de Ávila Carranza and Isabel de la Cerda serving as ecomenderos in 1704.

Yucatán declared its independence from the Spanish Crown in 1821, and in 1825 the area was assigned to the High Sierra partition with headquarters in Tekax Municipality. In 1867, it was moved to the jurisdiction of the Peto Municipality. It was transferred again to the Tzucacab Municipality in 1910 and finally became its own municipality in 1918.

Governance
The municipal president is elected for a three-year term. The town council has four councilpersons, who serve as Secretary and councilors of public works, education and health, recruitment and potable water.

The Municipal Council administers the business of the municipality. It is responsible for budgeting and expenditures and producing all required reports for all branches of the municipal administration. Annually it determines educational standards for schools.

The Police Commissioners ensure public order and safety. They are tasked with enforcing regulations, distributing materials and administering rulings of general compliance issued by the council.

Communities
The head of the municipality is Chacsinkín, Yucatán. The municipality has 10 populated places besides the seat including Chimay Mul, Sabacché, Sisbic, Xbox and X-cohil. The significant populations are shown below:

Local festivals
Every year on 12 June, there is a festival in honor of Saint Anthony of Padua.

Tourist attractions
 Church of Saint Peter, built during the seventeenth century

References

Municipalities of Yucatán